Communauté d'agglomération de la Presqu'île de Guérande Atlantique (also: Cap Atlantique) is the communauté d'agglomération, an intercommunal structure, centred on the towns of La Baule-Escoublac and Guérande. It is located in the Loire-Atlantique and Morbihan departments, in the Pays de la Loire and Brittany regions, western France. Created in 2017, its seat is in La Baule-Escoublac. Its area is 386.1 km2. Its population was 75,119 in 2019.

Composition
The communauté d'agglomération consists of the following 15 communes, of which 3 (Camoël, Férel and Pénestin) in the Morbihan department:

Assérac
Batz-sur-Mer
La Baule-Escoublac
Camoël
Le Croisic
Férel
Guérande
Herbignac
Mesquer
Pénestin
Piriac-sur-Mer
Le Pouliguen
Saint-Lyphard
Saint-Molf
La Turballe

References

Presqu'ile de Guerande Atlantique
Presqu'ile de Guerande Atlantique
Presqu'ile de Guerande Atlantique